is a lake  in Kushiro, Hokkaidō, Japan. It is located in Akan National Park and is a Ramsar Site.

History
Volcanic activity formed the lake some 6,000 years ago, when a lava dam was formed. The lake used to have a clarity of 8–9 meters in the 1930s. Pollution from local hotspring resorts has decreased the transparency to 3–4 meters.

Flora and fauna
The lake is famous for the marimo (Aegagropila linnaei), aggregations of algae that form into spherical shapes 2–30 cm in diameter. Other flora of the lake include the following:
Phragmites communis
Nuphar sp.
Potamogeton crispus
Hydrilla verticillata
Myriophyllum verticillatum
Vallisneria gigantea
Melosira italica
Asterionella formosa
Synedra

Kokanee salmon (Oncorhynchus nerka) are native to Lake Akan.
Other fauna of the lake include the following:
Zooplankton:
Daphnia longiremis
Bosmina coregoni
Eurytemora affinis
Bottom:
Chironomus plumosus
Tubificidae
Fish:
Cyprinus carpio
Carassius
Hypomesus olidus
Leuciscus hakonensis

Climate

See also
List of Special Places of Scenic Beauty, Special Historic Sites and Special Natural Monuments
Ramsar sites in Japan

References

Lakes of Hokkaido
Ramsar sites in Japan
Volcanic crater lakes
Volcanoes of Hokkaido
Calderas of Hokkaido
VEI-7 volcanoes
Lava dammed lakes